Dharmapala (Siddhamātṛikā Script: , Dha-rmma-pā-la; Bangla: ধর্মপাল)(ruled between 770s-810s AD) was the second ruler of the Pala Empire of Bengal and Bihar regions in the Indian subcontinent. He was the son and successor of Gopala, the founder of the Pala Dynasty. He greatly expanded the boundaries of the empire, and made the Palas a dominant power in the northern and eastern India.

Dharmapala directly ruled over the present-day Bengal and Bihar, and installed a nominee at Kannauj. The Pala chronicles also claim that several other rulers of North India acknowledged his suzerainty, but these claims seem to be exaggerated. Dharmapala was defeated twice by the Gurjara-Pratiharas, but each time the Rashtrakutas subsequently defeated the Pratiharas, leaving Palas as the dominant power in North India. Dharmapala was succeeded by his son Devapala who further expanded the empire.

Reign 

Based on the different interpretations of the various epigraphs and historical records, the different historians estimate Dharmapala's reign as follows:

Expansion of the empire 

Dharamapala directly ruled over the present-day Bengal and Bihar regions. Since the extent of Gopala's kingdom is not known, it is uncertain if Dharmapala inherited these territories or acquired them through conquests.

He also became dominant in other areas of North India, but the exact details of his victories are not available. It is known that he defeated Indraraja (or Indrayudha), the ruler of Kanauj, who was a vassal of the Pratiharas. He then handed over the throne to his own nominee Charkayudha, and held an imperial court at Kannauj. According to the Khalimpur copper plate issued by Dharmapala, this court was attended by the rulers of Bhoja (possibly Vidarbha), Matsya (Jaipur and north-east Rajasthan), Madra (East Punjab), Kuru (Haryana-Delhi-Western UP region), Yadu (possibly Mathura, Dwarka or Siṁhapura in the Punjab (Katas Raj Temples)), Yavana, Avanti, Gandhara and Kira (Kangra Valley). These kings accepted the installation of Chakrayudha on the Kannauj throne, while "bowing down respectfully with their diadems trembling". Some historians have speculated that all these kingdoms might have been the vassal states of the Pala empire. Although the rulers of these regions may have paid obeisance to Dharmapala, but maintained their autonomy.

The Kannauj dispute resulted in a struggle between Dharmapala and the Pratihara king Vatsaraja. Vatsaraja defeated Dharmapala in a battle fought near Prayag. Shortly after this, Vatsaraja himself was defeated by the Rashtrakuta king Dhruva of southern India. After Vatsaraja's defeat, Dharmapala regained the control of Kannauj, but was defeated by Dhruva. However, soon after this, Dhruva returned to his southern kingdom, and thus, Dharmapala did not lose much in this quick chain of events. These events had left the Pratiharas badly mauled, which indirectly helped Dharmapala. After Dhruva's death in 793 CE, the Rashtrakutas were weakened by a war of succession. Taking advantage of this situation, Dharmapala recaptured Kannauj and placed his vassal Chakrayudha on the throne. He became the most powerful ruler in North India, and declared himself as Uttarapathasvamin ("Lord of Northern India").

According to the Monghyr (Munger) copper plate, Dharmapala offered prayers at Kedar (possibly Kedarnath) and Gokarna (variously identified with Gokarna in Nepal, Gokarna in Karnataka or a place in Orissa). This indicates that his position as a sovereign was accepted by most rulers, although this was a loose arrangement unlike the empire of the Mauryas or the Guptas. The other rulers acknowledged the military and political supremacy of Dharmapala, but maintained their own territories. One tradition also claims that Nepal was a vassal state of the Pala Empire during his reign.

Sometime later, Dharmapala faced another attack by the Pratiharas. Vatsaraja's son Nagabhata II conquered Kannauj, making Chakrayudha his vassal. This brought Dharmapala and Nagabhata II into a military conflict near Munger. Dharmapala suffered a defeat, but in a repeat of history, the Rashtrakutas invaded the Pratihara kingdom. Nagabhata II was defeated by the Rashtrakuta king and Dhruva's son Govinda III. Govinda III then proceeded to Kannauj, and subdued both Chakrayudha and Dharmapala. Like his father, Govinda III then returned to his kingdom in the south. Once again, Dharmapala re-established his authority in North India. Dharamapala remained the dominant ruler in North India till the end of his life.

Dharmapala ruled for about 40 years, and was succeeded by his son Devapala.

Patronage to Buddhism 

Dharmapala was a great patron of Buddhism. He granted 200 villages to Nalanda university and revived it. He  founded the Vikramashila monastery which later evolved into a great learning centre of Buddhism. Vikramashila had about 100 professors, and was managed by a governing body of six member. The most celebrated name associated with the Vikramshila University was that of Buddhist scholar Atiśa, who was greatly respected in Tibet. One of its rectors, Ratnakirshanti, a logician, was invited to Ceylon. During Dharmapala's reign Buddhagupta was rector or the university. He is remembered with a shrine on the Buddhist archaeological site North Serebang Perai in the state Kedah in Malaysia. Dharmapala built the great Somapura Mahavihara in Paharpur, Naogaon District, Bangladesh.  Taranath also credits him with establishing 50 religious institutions and patronising the Buddhist author Haribhadra. Buton Rinchen Drub credits Dharmapala with building the monastery at Uddandapura (Odantapuri), although other Tibetan accounts such as that of Taranatha, state that it was magically built and then entrusted to Devapala.

Epigraphs 

The epigraphs from Dharmapala's reign include:

 Bodhgaya Stone Inscription (Kesava Prasasti)
 Dated in the 26th regnal year, this inscription is a work of Kesava, who was the son of sculptor Ujjala. It records the establishment of an image of Chaturmukha (four-faced) Mahadeva and the excavation of a lake at the cost of 3000 drammas (coins) at Mahabodhi.

 Khalimpur Copper Plate
 Dated in the 32nd regnal year, this copper plate is inscribed by Tatata, who was the son of Subhata and grandson of Bhojata. It records Dharmapala's defeat of Indrayudha and the installation of his tributary Chakrayudha at Kannauj. It states that the kings of Bhoja, Matsya, Madra, Kuru, Yadu, Yavana, Avanti, Gandhara and Kira (possibly Kangra) attended the imperial assembly and approved it. It further states that Dharmapala granted four villages to a feudal lord called Naryanavarman for the construction and maintenance of a temple dedicated to the Lord Nanna-Narayana, with the boundaries of the donated villages including a shrine constructed for the Goddess Kadamvari. The dyutaka or emissary of this plate is Yuvaraja (Crown Prince) Tribhuvanpala.

 Nalanda Copper Plate
 This plate is partially damaged due to burning. The name of the donor is not clear, but his father's name is Dharmadatta. It records the gift of a village Uttarama, situated in the Gaya visaya (district) of the Nagar bhukti (division).

 Nalanda Stone Inscription
 This inscription is a work of the artisans Kese, Savvo, Vokkaka and Viggata. It is inscribed on a stupa sculpture with carvings that depict seated Buddha figures. It records Vairochana as the person who commissioned this deed, describing him as a brilliant and valiant man who lived during the rule of Dharmapala.

 Valgudar Image Inscription
 It records the dedication of an image of god Madhusrenika by Ajhuka, the wife of Sato, in the city of Krimila.

 Paharpur Seals
 These two seals were discovered from the Somapura Mahavihara. Both depict a dharma chakra flanked by antelopes, and state that they were issued by the monks belonging to a vihara at Somapura, which was established by Dharmapala.

See also
List of rulers of Bengal

References

Further reading
Pankaj Tandon: "A Gold Coin of the Pala king Dharmapala," Numismatic Chronicle, No. 166, 2006, pp. 327–333.
History and Culture of Indian People, The Age of Imperial Kanauj, p 44, Dr Majumdar, Dr Pusalkar

External links
Coin of Dharmapala

Pala kings
Year of death unknown
Year of birth unknown
Indian Buddhist monarchs
8th-century Indian monarchs
9th-century Indian monarchs